Cast from the Platform is the second album by American dream pop band Auburn Lull, released May 17, 2004 by Darla Records. It was produced by Andrew Prinz of Mahogany.

Track listing 
All tracks written by Auburn Lull.

"Building Fifty" – 5:01
"Sinking Meridian" – 1:52
"Jersey Narrows" – 3:57
"Season of False Starts" – 4:16
"Deterior" – 5:43
"Direction & Destination" – 5:02
"Rising Meridian" – 1:37
"Seaforth" – 4:57
"Trenches" – 4:53
"Sovereign Messages" – 3:41
"Shallow in Youth" – 6:35
hidden track – 10:09

Personnel 
 Kevin Bartley – mastering
 Sean Heenan – guitar, vocals, oscillator
 Jason Kolb – organ, synthesizer, bass, guitar, tapes
 Robert Gerard Pietrusko – additional engineering and mixing
 Andrew Prinz – synthesizer, piano, arranger, cello, vocals, design, photography, instrumentation

2004 albums
Auburn Lull albums
Ambient albums by American artists
Post-rock albums by American artists